Internetowa encyklopedia PWN (Polish for Internet PWN Encyclopedia) is a free online Polish-language encyclopedia published by Wydawnictwo Naukowe PWN. It contains some 80,000 entries and 5,000 illustrations.

External links
 Internetowa encyklopedia PWN 

Online encyclopedias
Polish online encyclopedias
Polish Scientific Publishers PWN books